Norbury is a civil parish in the Borough of Stafford, Staffordshire, England. It contains 15 listed buildings that are recorded in the National Heritage List for England. Of these, one is listed at Grade I, the highest of the three grades, and the others are at Grade II, the lowest grade. The parish contains the village of Norbury and the surrounding countryside.  Passing through the parish is the Shropshire Union Canal, and this meets the former Newport Branch, now disused, at Norbury Junction.  Most of the listed buildings are associated with the canal systems, and these include three bridges, two tunnels, a cottage, a boat maintenance workshop, and three mileposts.  The other listed buildings are a church and houses.


Key

Buildings

References

Citations

Sources

Lists of listed buildings in Staffordshire